The Islamabad Literature Festival (ILF) is an international literary festival held annually in Islamabad, Pakistan.

History
ILF was established in 2013. It features prominent literary figures, guest speakers and attendees including writers, poets, scholars and academics from all over Pakistan, as well as internationally. The event incorporates reading and literary debate sessions, lectures, poetry reading, plays, art fairs and book launches. Like the Karachi Literature Festival, ILF is also organised and produced by the Oxford University Press Pakistan.

Editions
The first ILF was held on April 30 and 31, 2013. The second edition was held from 25 to 28 April 2014. The third edition was held from April 24 to 26, 2015.

See also

 Culture of Islamabad
 Karachi Literature Festival
 Sindh Literature Festival

References

External links
 
 
 

2013 establishments in Pakistan
Annual events in Pakistan
Book fairs in Pakistan
Literary festivals in Pakistan
Recurring events established in 2013
Culture in Islamabad
Events in Islamabad